Mekelle 70 Enderta FC (Amharic: መቐለ 70 እንደርታ; Tigrinya: መቐለ 70 እንደርታ) is an Ethiopian football club based in Mekelle, Ethiopia. They are a member of the Ethiopian Football Federation and currently play in the top division of Ethiopian football, the Ethiopian Premier League. The club was promoted to the Ethiopian Premier League for the first time after the end of the 2016–17 season. In the 2018/19 season Mekelle 70 Enderta became champion of the Ethiopian Premier League and represented Ethiopia at the 2019 CAF Champions League but fall short in the first round.

Currently the club is one of the leading teams in the 2019/2020 Ethiopian Premier League .

History 
2016—2017

Mekelle 70 Enderta finished second (with 60 points) in the Ethiopian Higher League Group A after the 2016–2017 season. They earned a spot in the Ethiopian Premier League by virtue of winning a one-game playoff against Hadiya Hossana, who finished second in the Ethiopian Higher League Group. This was the club's first promotion to the top division in its history.

2017—2018

After promotion to the Ethiopian Premier League, the club officials sacked manager Getachew Dawit who helped the team earn spot in the top division. As rumoured, the main reason for the sacking of the manager was political reasons. So the club signed manager Yohannes Sahle for the 2017-2018 season. Mekelle 70 Enderta had one of their most successful campaigns in the 2017–18 season as the club was part of the title race until very late in the season before ultimately finishing 4th. After the club's first season in the top division, Mekelle 70 Enderta parted ways with head coach Yohannes Sahle.

2018—2019

On August 8, 2018, the club officially signed Gebremedhin Haile as their manager for the upcoming 2018–19 season. Manager Gebremedhin Haile, who had won his first Ethiopian Premier League title with Jimma Aba Jifar F.C. the last season.

After a poor start in the Ethiopian Premier League 2018—19, highly rated manager Gebremedhin Haile helped the team break a new record in the league (11 wins in a row) which was held by Saint George FC. Then after holding the record followed disappointing results, and rivals Fasil City topped the league table. The season went on as Fasil City being on top of the league with just one point ahead of Mekelle 70 Enderta until the last match of the league. July 7, 2019 (date of the last match of the league) was a historic day for the Red Lioness as Fasil City drop two points against Shire Endaselassie F.C. in the last match of the league and Mekelle 70 Enderta winning over Dire Dawa City with the help of Amanuel Gebremichael and Osei Mawuli goals. Then the club honored with its first Ethiopian Premier League title after tiring season. And forward Amanuel Gebremichael winning the League Golden Boot scoring 18 goals.

Name and logo 
The team is named after the city it was founded in, Mekelle 70 Enderta (the capital of the northern Tigray Region of Ethiopia).
The Club logo is a red circle, inside the circle are 2 red lions, in the middle that have Hawelti Semaetat statue, and at the top the castle of king Yohannes IV which are found in the city of Mekelle.

Grounds 
The team plays its home games in Tigray International Stadium in Mekelle, Ethiopia. The stadium has a 60,000 capacity.

Derby 
The club plays in the "Tigray Derby" with fellow Tigray Region club Welwalo Adigrat University FC. and Fasil City which is believed to be an arch rival. The derbies enjoy relatively large attendances.

Managers 
  Gebremedhin Haile (2018–Present)
 Yohannes Sahle (2017–18)
 Getachew Dawit (2016–17)

Honours
Ethiopian Premier League: 1
2019.

Performance in CAF competitions
CAF Champions League: 2 appearances
2020 – Preliminary Round
2021 – withdrew in Preliminary Round

CAF Confederation Cup: 0 appearance

Players

First-team squad
As of 12 January 2020

References 

Football clubs in Ethiopia
Sport in Tigray Region
Mekelle